Olekhovo is the name of several rural localities in Russia.

Modern localities
Olekhovo, Kaliningrad Oblast, a settlement in Novostroyevsky Rural Okrug of Ozyorsky District of Kaliningrad Oblast
Olekhovo, Kalininskoye Settlement, Moshenskoy District, Novgorod Oblast, a village in Kalininskoye Settlement of Moshenskoy District of Novgorod Oblast
Olekhovo, Mezhdurechensky District, Vologda Oblast, a village in Staroselsky Selsoviet of Mezhdurechensky District of Vologda Oblast
Olekhovo, Vologodsky District, Vologda Oblast, a village in Kubensky Selsoviet of Vologodsky District of Vologda Oblast
Olekhovo, Rybinsky District, Yaroslavl Oblast, a village in Arefinsky Rural Okrug of Rybinsky District of Yaroslavl Oblast
Olekhovo, Tutayevsky District, Yaroslavl Oblast, a village in Rodionovsky Rural Okrug of Tutayevsky District of Yaroslavl Oblast

Abolished localities
Olekhovo, Orekhovskoye Settlement, Moshenskoy District, Novgorod Oblast, a village in Orekhovskoye Settlement of Moshenskoy District of Novgorod Oblast; abolished in September 2012